Bolt is a 2008 American computer animated comedy-adventure film produced by Walt Disney Animation Studios and released by Walt Disney Pictures. The 48th Disney animated feature film, it was directed by Chris Williams and Byron Howard (in their feature directorial debuts) and produced by Clark Spencer, from a screenplay written by Williams and Dan Fogelman. The film stars the voices of John Travolta, Susie Essman, Mark Walton, Miley Cyrus, Malcolm McDowell, Diedrich Bader, Nick Swardson, and Greg Germann. This was also one of the final film roles for James Lipton before his death in 2020, the other being Igor, which was released the same year as Bolt. 

The film's plot centers on a dog named Bolt, who has spent his entire life on the set of a television series, firmly believes that he has super powers. When his beloved owner Penny is "kidnapped" on the show, Bolt runs away from the set to rescue her, eventually teaming up with sarcastic alley cat Mittens and Bolt super-fan Rhino the hamster on a cross-country journey back home. 

Bolt premiered at the El Capitan Theatre in Los Angeles on November 17, 2008, and was released in the United States on November 21. Despite a relatively marginal box-office performance, the film received a strong positive critical reception. It is also regarded for helping to instigate a rebirth of Walt Disney Animation Studios, setting the studio on a new creative direction that led to other critically acclaimed features such as Tangled (2010) and Frozen (2013).

The film was nominated for a series of awards, such as the Academy Award for Best Animated Feature, Golden Globe Award for Best Animated Feature Film and Golden Globe Award for Best Original Song.

Plot

A White Swiss Shepherd puppy named Bolt is adopted by a 7-year-old girl named Penny. Five years later, Bolt and a 12-year-old Penny star in a hit television series called Bolt, in which Bolt uses various superpowers to help Penny foil the plans of the villain, Dr. Calico, who has kidnapped Penny's father. To gain a more realistic performance, the show's producers have deceived Bolt his entire life, arranging the filming in such a way that Bolt believes everything in the show is real, including his invulnerability, super-strength, and percussive sonic "Superbark". Penny disapproves, as this means Bolt can never leave the set and come home with her as a normal dog. After a cliffhanger episode causes Bolt to believe Penny has been kidnapped, he escapes from his on-set trailer in Hollywood, but knocks himself unconscious in a box of packing peanuts, which is then shipped to New York City.

Upon arrival in New York, Bolt is shocked to discover that his "superpowers" are useless. He encounters Mittens, a cynical feral cat who bullies pigeons out of their food. Believing that Mittens is an "agent" of Calico, Bolt ties her to his collar with a leash, and forces her to guide him back to Penny. Mittens is convinced her captor is a lunatic, but the two start their journey westward by truck. Meanwhile, in Hollywood, a less-experienced Bolt look-alike is brought in so filming can resume. Penny is genuinely distraught over Bolt’s disappearance, but reluctantly agrees to halt the search so production can continue. 

Feeling hungry for the first time in his life, Bolt accepts Mittens' advice and behaves like a cute and needy stray, securing food for them both at an RV park. They are joined by Rhino, a fearless hamster and huge Bolt fanatic. This causes Mittens to realize Bolt is from a TV show, but she is unable to convince him of the truth. In frustration, Bolt repeatedly attempts to "superbark" Mittens; the noise draws the attention of the local Animal control service, and Bolt and Mittens are both captured and taken to a shelter.

Bolt, freed from the patrol van by Rhino, finally realizes and accepts that he is just a normal dog. However, he regains his confidence after Rhino (oblivious to this revelation) exhorts him to heroism. They rescue Mittens from the shelter; as they continue west, Bolt and Mittens form a close friendship, in which she teaches Bolt how to be an ordinary dog and enjoy typical dog activities. Mittens makes plans for the three of them to stay in Las Vegas, but Bolt is still drawn to find Penny. Mittens, who was abandoned by her own humans, asserts that Penny is just an actor and that no human truly "loves" their pet. Bolt refuses to believe her, and continues on alone to Hollywood. Rhino scolds Mittens, saying friends should never abandon each other, and the two set off after him. 

When Bolt reaches the studio, he finds Penny embracing his look-alike during a rehearsal, and leaves feeling heartbroken. However, Mittens catches up to him and tells him that she overheard Penny and her mother after the rehearsal, both genuinely distressed about the loss of the real Bolt. At the same time, the Bolt look-alike panics during the show's filming and accidentally knocks over some lit torches, setting the stage on fire with Penny trapped inside. Bolt arrives, and the two reunite inside the burning studio, but are unable to escape before Penny begins to suffocate from the smoke. Penny begs Bolt to go, but Bolt refuses to leave her. Bolt repeatedly barks into the building's air vent, alerting the firefighters to their location.

Bolt and Penny are rescued, but Penny and her mother quit when their overeager agent proposes they exploit the incident for publicity purposes. The show continues with a replacement "Bolt" and "Penny" and a bizarre new storyline involving alien abduction. Penny adopts Mittens and Rhino, and she and her family move to a rural home to enjoy a simpler lifestyle together.

Cast
 John Travolta as Bolt
 Susie Essman as Mittens
 Mark Walton as Rhino
 Miley Cyrus as Penny
Chloë Grace Moretz as 7-year-old Penny
 Malcolm McDowell as Dr. Calico
 Nick Swardson as Blake
 Diedrich Bader as Veteran Cat
 Greg Germann as The Agent
 James Lipton as The Director
 Randy Savage as Thug
 Kari Wahlgren as Mindy
 Grey DeLisle as Penny's Mother
 J. P. Manoux as Tom
 Brian Stepanek as Martin
 Jeff Bennett as Lloyd
 John DiMaggio as Saul
 Jenny Lewis as Assistant Director

Production

Development
In November 2002, Chris Sanders and Dean DeBlois, the directors of Lilo & Stitch (2002), had signed a multi-picture deal with Walt Disney Pictures. It was also reported Sanders was working on an untitled computer-animated film. Nearly a year later, in November 2003, the project had been titled American Dog. The plot centered on Henry, a famous canine star, who one day finds himself stranded in the Nevada desert with a testy, one-eyed cat and an oversized, radioactive rabbit who are themselves searching for new homes, all the while believing he is still on television. In August 2005, the project's conceptual artwork and synopsis were then showcased publicly at the annual SIGGRAPH conference. By November 2005, American Dog had been slated for a summer 2008 release. 

Following the corporate acquisition of Pixar Animation Studios, John Lasseter and Ed Catmull had been respectively appointed as Chief Creative Officer and President of Walt Disney Animation Studios and Pixar. In the fall of 2006, Lasseter, along with other directors from Pixar and Disney, attended two screenings of the film and gave Sanders suggestive notes on how to improve the story. Catmull stated "somewhere along the way, the plot had also come to include a radioactive, cookie-selling Girl Scout zombie serial killer. I'm all for quirky ideas, but this one had metastasized." In December 2006, Sanders was removed from the project, and by early 2007, he had joined DreamWorks Animation. According to Lasseter, Sanders was replaced because he had resisted the changes that he and the other directors had suggested. Lasseter was quoted as saying "Chris Sanders is extremely talented, but he couldn't take it to the place it had to be." Earlier that same month, Disney had laid off about 160 employees within its animation division.

In February 2007, Lasseter had confirmed Chris Williams and Byron Howard were the film's new directors. As directors, Williams focused on the story reels and layout while Howard tackled character design and animation. The radioactive rabbit and eyepatch-wearing cat characters were removed from the story while the dog Henry (now renamed Bolt) was redesigned into a White Shepherd with a lightning bolt-shaped patch that runs down the left side of his body. Furthermore, Lasseter ordered the American Southwest setting to be removed given his then-recent film Cars (2006) had a similar terrain. Following the story overhaul, the animation team was told to complete the animation in 18 months instead of the usual four years that is normally required to produce a computer-animated feature. On June 8, 2007, Disney announced that the film, now under its current name, would be released on November 21, 2008 in Disney Digital 3-D.

Animation
The look of the film was inspired by the paintings of Edward Hopper and the cinematography of Vilmos Zsigmond. New technology in non-photorealistic rendering (NPR) was used to give it a special visual appearance, a technique later used in Tangled (2010). To give the film's 3D backgrounds a hand-painted look, the company artists used new patented technology designed specifically for the film.

Bolt's characteristics are based on an amalgam of breeds, although the designers started with the American White Shepherd. Joe Moshier, lead character designer, said, "they American White Shepherds have really long ears, a trait that I tried to caricature in order to allow the animators to emphasize Bolt's expressiveness."

The design of Rhino in his plastic ball was based on executive producer John Lasseter's pet chinchilla, which was brought to an animators' retreat during the film's production.

Music

The score to Bolt was composed by John Powell. The soundtrack featured the film's score and two original songs – "I Thought I Lost You" by Bolts stars Miley Cyrus and John Travolta (nominated for a Golden Globe Award for Best Original Song on 2009) as well as "Barking at the Moon" by Rilo Kiley singer Jenny Lewis. The soundtrack was released on November 18, 2008.

Motörhead's song "Dog-Face Boy" (from their Sacrifice album) is in a scene in which a mailroom worker is listening to it on headphones while inadvertently wrapping Bolt up in a box that gets shipped to New York City.

Track listing

Release
Bolt had its world premiere on November 17, 2008 in Los Angeles at the El Capitan Theatre. It was commercially released in theaters in the United States on November 21, 2008. By its fourth week in theaters, the film was accompanied by Pixar's Cars Toons short Tokyo Mater.

Home media
Bolt was released on Blu-Ray in the United States on March 22, 2009. The Blu-Ray combo set included a standard DVD and digital copy versions of the film. Single-disc DVD and Special Edition DVD with Digital Copy versions followed in Region 1 on March 24. This marked the first time a major home-video release debuted on Blu-ray Disc before DVD. Bolt was released on both Blu-ray and DVD in the United Kingdom on June 15, 2009.

A short film called Super Rhino is included in the DVD and Blu-ray versions of the film. By December 2009, the DVD has sold over 4.5 million copies, generating $81.01 million in consumer sales.

The 3D Blu-ray version of the film was released in November 2010, in France and UK. A month later, it was released worldwide exclusively to select Sony TVs. In the United States, it was released on November 8, 2011.

Reception

Box office
On its opening weekend, the film opened in third place, earning $26.2 million behind Twilight and Quantum of Solace. On its second weekend, it rose to second place, earning nearly $26.6 million behind Four Christmases. Overall, Bolt grossed $114.1 million in the United States and Canada and $195.9 million in international territories, totaling $310 million worldwide.

Critical reaction
The website's critical consensus reads: "Bolt is a pleasant animated comedy that overcomes the story's familiarity with strong visuals and likable characters." Another review aggregator, Metacritic, calculated a score of 67 based on 29 reviews, indicating "generally favorable reviews". Audiences polled by CinemaScore gave the film an average grade of "A-" on an A+ to F scale.

Kenneth Turan of the Los Angeles Times wrote that Bolt was "a sweet Disney family film, but Lasseter's oversight has made it smarter than it otherwise would have been. It's not in Pixar's league, but it's laced with idiosyncratic characters with pleasantly wacky attitudes. That may sound like the obvious thing to do but that doesn't mean anyone else has done it." Michael Rechtshaffen of The Hollywood Reporter felt the film was a "notable step up for Walt Disney Animation Studios", although he felt the script needed "more of a comedic punch, with fuller character quirks and complexities to go along with the enhanced visual dimension." Nevertheless, Rechtshaffen complimented the vocal performances from Travolta, Cyrus, and Malcolm McDowell. Todd McCarthy, reviewing for Variety, noted the film was an "OK Disney animated entry enhanced by nifty 3-D projection" as it "bears some telltale signs of Pixar's trademark smarts, but still looks like a mutt compared to the younger company's customary purebreds." 

A. O. Scott of The New York Times complimented the film as "a real movie[,] not a great one, perhaps, but a more organic and thought-out piece of work than the usual animated hodgepodge that lures antsy children and their dutiful parents into the multiplexes. It has its sentimental strains, but it doesn't push them too hard, or resort to the crude, pandering humor of, say, the Shrek franchise." Perry Seibert of TV Guide gave the film 3 stars out of 4 and wrote the film "amuses both those who make up the film's target audience and the parents along for the ride. This winning mix of exciting action, heart-tugging sentiment, and gentle character comedy makes Bolt yet another solid addition to Disney's history of family-friendly fare." Tasha Robinson of The A.V. Club gave the film a B+, stating that "Bolt is the studio's first film since Lilo & Stitch that feels like it's trying to recapture the old Disney instead of aggressively shedding it in favor of something slick and new. And yet it comes with a healthy cutting-edge Pixar flavor as well." 

Michael Phillips of the Chicago Tribune awarded the film  stars out of four, writing he personally "felt abandoned just watching it. It's a seriously withholding action comedy, stingy on the wit, charm, jokes, narrative satisfactions and animals with personalities sharp enough for the big screen, either in 2-D or 3-D. I saw it in 3-D, which helped, especially with an early, massively destructive chase through the streets and freeways of Los Angeles. Plus, the herky-jerky movements in the head and neck region of three credulous pigeons -- those were funny." Joe Morgenstern of The Wall Street Journal wrote: "I did not find Bolt lovable. Likable, yes, and occasionally endearing -- yet the best parts involve a hamster in a plastic ball. The movie dog's confusions are entertaining, though they're familiar to anyone who has seen Buzz Lightyear in Pixar's peerless Toy Story films. But the spunk of the hamster, a corpulent rodent named Rhino, is stirring, and there's a timeless purity to the spectacle of him scurrying around in his private little sphere."

Award nominations
Bolt was nominated for the following awards:
2008 Academy Award for Best Animated Feature – lost to WALL-E
2008 Annie Award for Best Animated Feature – lost to Kung Fu Panda
2008 Broadcast Film Critics Association Award for Best Animated Feature – lost to WALL-E
2008 Chicago Film Critics Association Award for Best Animated Film – lost to WALL-E
2008 Golden Globe Award for Best Animated Feature Film – lost to WALL-E
2008 Golden Globe Award for Best Original Song - lost to The Wrestler
2008 Online Film Critics Society Award for Best Animated Film – lost to WALL-E
2008 Producers Guild of America's Best Animated Motion Picture – lost to WALL-E
2008 Satellite Award for Best Animated or Mixed Media Feature – lost to WALL-E
2009 Kids' Choice Awards for Favorite Animated Movie – lost to Madagascar: Escape 2 Africa
2009 Visual Effects Society Award for "Outstanding Animation in an Animated Feature Motion Picture"  – lost to WALL-E
2009 Visual Effects Society Award for "Outstanding Animated Character in an Animated Feature Motion Picture" (two nominations for "Bolt" and "Rhino")  – lost to WALL-E
2009 Visual Effects Society Award for "Outstanding Effects Animation in an Animated Feature"  – lost to WALL-E

Video games

Disney Interactive Studios produced a video game based on the film, released in November 2008 for Nintendo DS, Wii, PlayStation 2, PlayStation 3, Xbox 360 and PC. The game focuses on Bolt's fake TV life, not the actual storyline. A separate game was released for mobile phones, and a third game, RhinoBall, was released as an application on Apple's App Store.

References

External links

 
 
 
 
 

2008 films
2008 computer-animated films
2008 3D films
2000s adventure comedy films
2000s American animated films
2000s children's comedy films
2000s road movies
American adventure comedy films
American children's animated adventure films
American children's animated comedy films
American computer-animated films
American road movies
Animated films about cats
Animated films about dogs
Bolt (franchise)
2000s English-language films
Films directed by Byron Howard
Films directed by Chris Williams
Films about pets
Films set in the Las Vegas Valley
Animated films set in Los Angeles
Animated films set in New York (state)
Films set in Ohio
Films with screenplays by Chris Williams
Walt Disney Animation Studios films
Walt Disney Pictures animated films
Films scored by John Powell
2000s children's animated films
Films with screenplays by Dan Fogelman
2008 comedy films
Films produced by Clark Spencer